Felix Kolawole Salako (born 18 April 1961) is a Nigerian professor of Soil Physics who served as Vice Chancellor of the Federal University of Agriculture, Abeokuta, Ogun state, Nigeria from 2017 to 2022. He is also a Fellow of the Soil Science Society of Nigeria (FSSSN) and was a two-term deputy vice chancellor before his elevation as a vice chancellor.

Education 
Salako attended Apostolic Church Grammar School, Orishigun village, Lagos in January 1973. He was the Labour Prefect during the 1976/77 academic session and graduated in 1977 with Division One of the West African School Certificate (WASC). He then proceeded to the University of Nigeria, Nsukka where he received a B.Agric and a Msc in Soil Sciences in 1983 and 1986 ,respectively. He later ogot is PhD from Uthe niversity of Ibadan in 1997.

Career 
Salako began his career in 1987 as a Consulting Soil Scientist at TCI Associates, Ibadan. He later proceeded to the International Institute of Tropical Agriculture (IITA), Ibadan in 1989 to manage, first, an IITA/United Nations University project located inside Okomu Oil Palm Company, Okomu Forest Reserve, Edo State as a Resident Research Associate. He eventually worked on different research projects in IITA, Ibadan for eleven years (1989-2000).

Professor Salako joined the services of the Federal University of Agriculture, Abeokuta (FUNAAB), in 2000 as a Senior Lecturer in the Department of Soil Science and Land Management (formerly Department of Soil Science and Agricultural Mechanization). Apart from teaching courses at undergraduate and postgraduate levels, he has supervised over 50 undergraduate projects and over 30 postgraduate theses.  He was an Acting Head of department from February 2001 to December, 2006. He became a professor of Soil Physics In 2006 and he has, to his credit, over 90 publications in learned journals, book chapters, conference proceedings and technical reports.

He was re-appointed Head of the department, again, between January and March 2008 after a year of sabbatical leave at the University of Venice, Venice, Italy. In March 2008, he was appointed the Director, Agricultural Media Resources and Extension Centre (AMREC), a position he held until March, 2011. He became the Pioneer Director, Community-Based Farming Scheme (COBFAS), from March 2011 to September, 2011. He moved on to become the Deputy Vice-Chancellor (Development) in September 2011 and spent two-terms of two years each until December, 2015.

Professor Salako was listed in Marquis Who-is-Who in Science and Engineering, Eighth Edition, 2005-2006 for Outstanding Achievements. He has won many research-support grants, which included the Third World Academy of Sciences (TWAS) and the Training and Research in Italian Laboratories (TRIL) of the Abdus Salam International Centre for Theoretical Physics (ICTP), Italy. He participated actively from 2016 to 2020 in the African Cassava Agronomy Initiative (ACAI as the southwest coordinator under the auspices of IITA, Ibadan. He is also a member of several Professional Societies and was once an Associate Editor for the Journal of Soil and Water Conservation, Iowa, USA.

Professor Salako focused his research over the years on: (1) Rainfall Erosivity and Soil Conservation, (2) Soil Water Flux and Evapotranspiration, and (3) Soil Water Management using Agronomic Practices and Improved Fallow Systems. He has been involved in Rural Community Development projects all over Nigeria. Some of these activities led to his being honored with chieftain titles in two communities in Ogun state; Ishaga Orile and Iwoye Ketu. He was also very active as a community leader in private residential areas.

References 

1961 births
Living people
Nigerian academic administrators
University of Nigeria alumni
University of Ibadan alumni
Academic staff of the Federal University of Agriculture, Abeokuta